Hönnige is a locality of the municipality Wipperfürth in the Oberbergischer Kreis of North Rhine-Westphalia, Germany.

Villages in North Rhine-Westphalia